Laura Noble (born 1974) is an English writer, gallerist and artist.

Writing
Laura Noble has written for numerous publications including The Observer, Next Level, Foam, Snoecks and Image magazines. She was a regular columnist in London Independent Photography and Editor-at-large for Photoicon Magazine. She has written for a number of monographs and is the author of The Art of Collecting Photography.

Diemar/Noble Photography
In 2009, after several years at The Photographers' Gallery she established the Diemar/Noble Photography Gallery in London. The gallery stocked and exhibited photography from the medium's early masters to contemporary work. In 2010, it was selected as the host gallery for the Prix Pictet commission by Ed Kashi. In the same year, Time Out called Diemar/Noble "one of the capital's top spots for photography."  The gallery closed in August 2012.

L A Noble Gallery
Noble founded L A Noble Gallery in September 2012. She is the sole director of the gallery which is predominantly focused on contemporary photography.

She continues to consult and curate external exhibitions including Robert Clayton's Estate at the Library of Birmingham.

FIX Photo Festival 
FIX Photo launched in 2016, a free exhibition of photography produced and curated by Noble. FIX Photo is an annual event, with curator led tours, artist talks, film screenings and a programme of workshops. The 2017 edition of FIX Photo included 23 artists, with "over 300 pieces showcased along ten rooms and four floors". It was curated in response to the consequences of the dramatic political shifts of 2016.

The British Journal of Photography described the show as mixing 'well-established photographers with little-known or emerging artists, and is gathered into four categories – identity, community, harmony & unity, and environment'. This year also saw the first FIX Photo Festival Awards, an open competition judged by Noble, Chris Steele-Perkins, photographer Lottie Davies and Digital Camera Magazine editor, Ben Brain.

Lectures and appearances
Noble is a visiting lecturer at Kingston University (2014–present), University of Westminster (2010–present), Falmouth University (2011–present) and Sotheby's Institute of Art, London (2013–present). She has delivered seminars on collecting photography at The National Museum of Warsaw (2015), Foam Amsterdam (2013), Glasgow Art Fair (2008) and at Fundacio Foto Colectania, Barcelona.

From 2009 to 2013, Noble was selected for the panel of delivering portfolio reviews at Rencontres d'Arles and as a member of the judging committee for The Renaissance Arts Prize - Photography and Video Art Awards. Noble has also been a member of the judging committee for the Cork Street Open (2011), The AOP Awards (2013), The London Photo Festival (2014) and was selected as the sole juror for the 8th Julia Margaret Cameron Award (2015). Noble was a nominator for the Kyoto Prize (2017) and the sole judge for the NYC4PA – New York Centre for Photography Dusk to Dawn Competition (2019). She has acted as a nominator for the Prix Pictet. since 2015.

Publications
The Art of Collecting Photography. AVA, 2006. , 
With Lluis Real. London. John Rule Sales & Marketing, 2006. , 
With Jonathan Anderson, Edwin Low, Tex Light & Sie Dallas. Chrysalis. Light & Sie, 2007
With Yvonne De Rosa, Sarah Milano. Crazy God. Damiani, 2008. , 
With Jonathan Anderson, Edwin Low. Circus. Lucky Panda , 2008
With Jennie Gunhammar. Somewhere I have never travelled, gladly beyond. Damiani, 2009. 
With Bertil Nilsson. Undisclosed: Images of the Contemporary Circus Artist. Canalside, 2011. 
With Damion Berger. In The Deep End. Schilt, 2011. , 
With Yvonne De Rosa, Sam Taylor-Johnson. Hidden Identities: Unfinished. Damiani, 2013. , 
With Robert Clayton, Jonathan Meades. Estate. Stay Free, 2015. , 
With Tom Broadbent. At home with the Furries. Stay Free, 2018. , 
With Chloe Rosser. Form & Function. Stay Free, 2018. , 
With Adriaan van Heerden. Unreal City. racked Earth, 2019. , 
With Joseph Ford. Invisible Jumpers. Hoxton Mini, 2019. , 
Contributor, edited by Odette England. Keeper of the Hearth: Picturing Roland Barthes’ Unseen Photograph. Schilt, 2020. , 
With Kai Weidenhöfer. Wall and Peace. Steidl, 2020.

References

External links
 L A Noble Gallery

Photographers from Manchester
English women writers
Living people
1974 births